Andrés Escobar Saldarriaga (13 March 1967 – 2 July 1994) was a Colombian footballer who played as a defender. He played for Atlético Nacional, BSC Young Boys, and the Colombia national team. Nicknamed The Gentleman, he was known for his clean style of play and calmness on the pitch.

On 2 July 1994, Escobar was murdered in the aftermath of the 1994 FIFA World Cup, reportedly as retaliation for having scored an own goal which contributed to the team's elimination from the tournament. His murder further tarnished the image of the country internationally. Ironically, Escobar himself had worked to promote a more positive image of Colombia, earning acclaim in the country. 

His previous coach, Francisco Maturana, denied that Escobar's murder had any connection to football or the World Cup, but rather was due to his being "in the wrong place at the wrong time" at a violent time in Colombia's history.

Escobar is still held in high regard by Colombian fans, and is especially mourned and remembered by Atlético Nacional's fans.

Early life
Andrés Escobar Saldarriaga was born in Medellín on 13 March 1967. He grew up in a middle-class family. He attended Colegio Calasanz and graduated from Instituto Conrado González. He participated in school football teams before becoming a professional football player.

His father is Darío Escobar, a banker who founded an organisation that gives young people the opportunity to play football instead of being on the streets. His brother, Santiago, is a former footballer who played alongside Andrés at Atlético Nacional before moving into team management in 1998.

Career
Escobar was a defender throughout his career. His jersey number was 2, and he was known by the nicknames "El Caballero del Fútbol" ("The Gentleman of Football") and "The Immortal Number 2". In his club career, he played for Colombian club Atlético Nacional and Swiss club Young Boys. He helped Nacional to win the 1989 Copa Libertadores.

Prior to the 1994 World Cup, Escobar was reported to have been offered a contract by A.C. Milan.

International career

He made his debut for the Colombia national team on 30 March 1988, in a 3–0 win against Canada. His first appearance in an international competition took place at the 1988 Rous Cup, where he also scored the only goal of his career in a 1–1 draw against England.

He played four matches at the 1989 Copa América when he was 22 years old. The team was eliminated in the first round of the tournament. The same year he also played at the 1990 FIFA World Cup qualification. The team was the winner of Group 2, but had to play the Intercontinental Play-off since it had the worst record among the group winners. Colombia won 1–0 on aggregate and qualified for the 1990 FIFA World Cup. Escobar played all the matches during the World Cup. The team reached the Round of 16 where it was eliminated with a 2–1 defeat against Cameroon.

Escobar was called up for the 1991 Copa América squad, where he made seven appearances. He did not participate in any games of the 1994 FIFA World Cup qualification, but he was called up for the World Cup.

Own goal incident and subsequent murder

Escobar's own goal occurred in Colombia's second group match against the United States during the 1994 FIFA World Cup. Stretching to block a cross from American midfielder John Harkes, he inadvertently deflected the ball into his own net. The United States took a 1–0 lead and ended up winning 2–1.	

After the 1994 FIFA World Cup, Escobar decided to return to Colombia instead of visiting relatives in Las Vegas, Nevada. On the evening of 1 July 1994, five days after the elimination of Colombia from the World Cup, Escobar called his friends, and they went to a bar in the El Poblado neighbourhood in Medellín. Then they went to a liquor store. Shortly afterwards, they arrived at the El Indio nightclub. His friends split up. At approximately 3:00 the next morning, Escobar was alone in the parking lot of El Indio, in his car, when three men appeared. They began arguing with him. Two of the men took out handguns. Escobar was shot six times with a .38 calibre pistol. It was reported that the killer shouted "¡Gol!" ("Goal!") after every shot, once for each time the South American football commentator said it during the broadcast. The group then drove away in a Toyota pick-up truck, leaving Escobar to bleed to death. Escobar was taken to the hospital where he died 45 minutes later.	

The murder was widely believed to be a punishment for the own goal. In the UK, the BBC issued a public apology after its football pundit Alan Hansen commented during the World Cup's Round of 16 match between Argentina and Romania that "The Argentine defender warrants shooting for a mistake like that," on 3 July, a day after the murder of Escobar.

Escobar's funeral was attended by more than 120,000 people. Every year people honour Escobar by bringing photographs of him to matches. In July 2002, the city of Medellín unveiled a statue in honour of his memory.

Humberto Castro Muñoz, a drug cartel bodyguard in Colombia, was arrested on the night of 2 July 1994, confessing the next day to the killing of Escobar. Castro also worked as a driver for Santiago Gallón, who had allegedly lost heavily betting on the outcome of the game. He was found guilty of Escobar's murder in June 1995. He was sentenced to 43 years in prison. The sentence was later reduced to 26 years because of his submitting to the ruling penal code in 2001. Humberto was released on good behaviour due to further reductions from prison work and study in 2005. His three accomplices were acquitted.

There are also allegations that the Gallón brothers bribed the Prosecutor's Office to redirect the investigation towards Castro as the triggerman – and the Prosecutor's Office contends that Castro was simply following orders from the Gallón brothers – but prosecutors lacked credible evidence to convict them. Pamela Cascardo, the girlfriend of Andrés Escobar, believes that the accusation of the Gallón brothers' bribery of government officials is supported by Castro's having killed a national celebrity and serving only 11 years in prison.

In 2013, then-coach Francisco Maturana denied that Escobar's murder had any connection to football or the World Cup, but rather was due to his being "in the wrong place at the wrong time" at a violent time in Colombia's history.

Legacy

Escobar's murder tarnished the image of Colombia internationally. Escobar himself had worked to promote a more positive image of Colombia, earning acclaim within the country.

Escobar is still held in high regard by Colombian fans, and is especially mourned and remembered by Atlético Nacional's fans. In a newspaper column published shortly before his killing, he said of Colombia's World Cup, "It’s been a most amazing and rare experience. We’ll see each other again soon because life does not end here."

After Escobar's death, his family founded the Andrés Escobar Project to help disadvantaged children learn to play football. Prior to the 2001 Copa América hosted by Colombia, the city of Medellín unveiled a statue of Escobar.

In popular culture
In 2010, a documentary film titled The Two Escobars was released as a part of ESPN's 30 for 30 documentary series. It was directed by Jeff and Michael Zimbalist, which looked back at Andrés Escobar's death, Colombia's 1994 World Cup run and the relationship between association football and the country's criminal gangs, notably the Medellín Cartel run by Pablo Escobar (unrelated to Andrés).

In 2022, Netflix released a mini-series titled The Final Score based on his life.

Personal life
Prior to his death, Escobar was engaged to his girlfriend for five years, a dentist named Pamela Cascardo. They would have been married later in 1994.
Escobar was a devout Catholic and would go to Mass every day before school with his mother until her death at the age of 52.

Career statistics

Club
This table is incomplete, thus some stats and totals could be incorrect.

International

International appearances

International goals

|}

Honours
Atlético Nacional
Primera A: 1991; runner-up: 1988, 1990, 1992
Copa Interamericana: 1989
Copa Libertadores: 1989
Intercontinental Cup: runner-up: 1989

Notes

References

External links
 
 
 

1967 births
1994 deaths
1989 Copa América players
1991 Copa América players
1990 FIFA World Cup players
1994 FIFA World Cup players
Atlético Nacional footballers
Association football defenders
BSC Young Boys players
Categoría Primera A players
Copa Libertadores-winning players
Colombia international footballers
Colombian expatriate footballers
Colombian expatriate sportspeople in Switzerland
Colombian footballers
Colombian Roman Catholics
Footballers from Medellín
Colombian murder victims
Deaths by firearm in Colombia
Expatriate footballers in Switzerland
Male murder victims
People murdered by Colombian organized crime
People murdered in Colombia